The 1994–95 season was Clydebank's twenty-ninth season in the Scottish Football League. They competed in the Scottish First Division and finished 8th. They also competed in the Scottish League Cup, Scottish Challenge Cup and Scottish Cup.

Results

Division 1

Final League table

Scottish League Cup

Scottish Challenge Cup

Scottish Cup

References

 

Clydebank
Clydebank F.C. (1965) seasons